Gordon S. Wyant, KC (born 1957) is a lawyer and politician from Saskatoon, Saskatchewan, Canada. Wyant currently serves as a member of the Legislative Assembly of Saskatchewan since winning a by-election in 2010. He resigned from Cabinet after announcing on August 25, 2017 that he would be running for the Saskatchewan Party Leadership to replace Premier Brad Wall. Wyant lost the leadership election to Scott Moe. When Moe was sworn in as premier, he appointed Wyant as Deputy Premier and Minister of Education.

Wyant previously served as a member of Saskatoon City Council from 2003 to 2010.

He was born and raised in Saskatoon, earning both a Bachelor of Arts and his law degree at the University of Saskatchewan. In 2008 he was appointed Queen's Counsel.  Wyant has also served as a member of the Saskatoon Board of Police Commissioners and on the Board of Directors of Saskatoon's Credit Union Centre.

Political career
Wyant was elected to the Legislative Assembly of Saskatchewan in a by-election on October 18, 2010, representing the electoral district of Saskatoon Northwest as a member of the Saskatchewan Party. He was re-elected in the 2011 general election. He previously served on Saskatoon City Council, serving in Ward 5 from 2003 until 2010.
On August 25, 2017 Wyant announced he was running for the leadership of the Saskatchewan Party. Wyant was eliminated on the third ballot, losing to eventual winner Scott Moe.

Personal life
Wyant has four adult children with his wife, Christine Hrudka.

Electoral history

 
|NDP
|Nicole White
|align="right"|1,718
|align="right"|25.39
|align="right"|-7.67

|Liberal
|Eric Steiner
|align="right"|135
|align="right"|2.00
|align="right"|-1.03
|- bgcolor="white"
!align="left" colspan=3|Total
!align="right"|6,767
!align="right"|100.00
!align="right"|

|-

 
|NDP
|Jan Dyky
|align="right"|1,711
|align="right"|33.06
|align="right"|+3.38

|Liberal
|Eric Steiner
|align="right"|157
|align="right"|3.03
|align="right"|-11.73
 
|Prog. Conservative
|Manny Sonnenschein
|align="right"|133
|align="right"|2.57
|align="right"|-

|- bgcolor="white"
!align="left" colspan=3|Total
!align="right"|5,175
!align="right"|100.00
!align="right"|

References

External links
 

Living people
1957 births
Saskatchewan Party MLAs
Saskatoon city councillors
University of Saskatchewan alumni
University of Saskatchewan College of Law alumni
21st-century Canadian politicians
Attorneys-General of Saskatchewan
Lawyers in Saskatchewan
Members of the Executive Council of Saskatchewan
Deputy premiers of Saskatchewan